Come Alive is an album by Contemporary Christian music singer/songwriter Mark Schultz, released on August 25, 2009.

Background 
Schultz got the idea for the album's second single, "He Is," from his wife. Before the release of the album, Schultz toured with Point of Grace in a nationwide Come Alive Tour.

Track listing

Personnel 
 Mark Schultz – lead vocals, backing vocals (3, 9)
 Blair Masters – keyboards (1, 9, 10), acoustic piano (3, 9, 10), programming (3), Hammond B3 organ (10)
 Matt Stanfield – keyboards (1), programming (1)
 Brown Bannister – programming (1), percussion (1, 3, 10)
 Shaun Shankel – keyboards (2, 5, 8), string arrangements (5, 8), bass (8)
 Bernie Herms – acoustic piano (4, 6, 7), string arrangements (4, 6, 7), keyboards (6, 7)
 Tom Bukovac – electric guitar (1, 3, 10), guitars (4), acoustic guitar (10)
 Jerry McPherson – electric guitar (1, 3, 10), guitars (9)
 Scott Denté – acoustic guitar (1)
 Nick De Partee – guitars (2)
 Paul Moak – guitars (2, 5, 8)
 Pete Stewart – guitars (2, 5, 8)
 Mike Payne – electric guitar (3)
 Kenny Greenberg – guitars (4)
 Trevor Morgan – acoustic guitar (4, 6, 7)
 Luke Buishas – guitars (5, 8)
 Neil DeGrade – guitars (6, 7)
 Adam Lester – guitars (6, 7)
 Tony Lucido – bass (1-5, 10)
 Joey Canaday – bass (6, 7, 9)
 Dan Needham – drums (1, 3, 6, 7, 9, 10), percussion (9)
 Will Sayles – drums (2, 5)
 Jerry Roe – drums (4)
 Ben Phillips – drums (8)
 Brown Bannister – percussion (1, 3, 10), programming (1)
 F. Reid Shippen – percussion (1, 3, 10)
 David Angell – strings (4-9)
 Monisa Angell – strings (4, 6, 7, 9)
 John Catchings – strings (4-9)
 Seanad Chang – strings (4, 6, 7)
 David Davidson – strings (4-9)
 Sarighani Reist – strings (4, 6, 7)
 Pamela Sixfin – strings (4-7)
 Karen Winkleman – strings (4, 6, 7)
 Conni Ellisor – strings (5, 8)
 Jim Grosjean – strings (5, 8)
 Anthony LaMarchina – strings (5, 8)
 Mary Kathryn Vanosdale – strings (5, 8)
 Kristin Wilkinson – strings (5, 8)
 Luke Brown – backing vocals (1, 3, 10)
 Missi Hale – backing vocals (1, 3)
 Thom Flora – backing vocals (4)
 Calvin Nowell – backing vocals (10), BGV arrangements (10)
 Nickie Conley – backing vocals (10)
 Debi Selby – backing vocals (10)

Choir on "Love Has Come"
 Chance Scoggins – choir director 
 Drew Cline, Nickie Conley, Leanne Palmore, Christy Richardson, Chance Scoggins, Debi Selby, Terry White, Jerard Woods and Jovaun Woods – choir singers

Production 
 Jamie Kiner – A&R 
 Brown Bannister – producer (1, 3, 10)
 Shaun Shankel – producer (2, 5, 8)
 Bernie Herms – producer (4, 6, 7)
 Paul Mills – producer (9)
 Justin Niebank – mixing (4)
 Craig Alvin – mixing (6, 7)
 Drew Bollman – mix assistant (4)
 Jeff Pillar – mix assistant (6, 7)

Reception 

This album received positive reviews by Allmusic. "A youth minister who left behind aspirations for stardom in Nashville, singer/songwriter Mark Schultz has ultimately pursued his dream, drawing crowds and building a following through work with his local congregation."

Awards 
In 2010, the album was nominated for a Dove Award for Pop/Contemporary Album of the Year at the 41st GMA Dove Awards.

Charts

Singles 

"-" denotes the single did not chart.

References 

2009 albums
Mark Schultz (musician) albums